Kleena Kleene  is an unincorporated settlement and recreational community on the western end of the Chilcotin Plateau, west of Tatla Lake and northeast of One-Eye Lake.  It lies in the upper reaches of the basin of the Klinaklini River, for which it is named, and which penetrates the Pacific Ranges of the Coast Mountains to enter the sea at the head of the Knight Inlet.  The community is recreational in nature and like nearby Nimpo Lake it is a base for sightseeing to Hunlen Falls, Klinaklini Falls and Chilko Lake, and for fly-outs to fishing on the area's many small plateau and alpine lakes.

Climate
Kleena Kleene is one of the driest locations in British Columbia because of the rain shadow effect of Coast Mountains located directly to the west. The temperature is cooler than the other similarly dry locations in the province.

References

External links
BritishColumbia.com "Kleena Kleene" page
Cariboo Chilcotin Coast website "Kleena Kleene" page

Populated places in the Chilcotin
Unincorporated settlements in British Columbia